Martín Ismael Payero (born 11 September 1998) is an Argentine professional footballer who plays as a midfielder for Primera División club Boca Juniors, on loan from  club Middlesbrough.

Club career
Banfield

Payero's career started with Banfield. He first appeared in their first-team squad during the Primera División season, making his debut against San Martín on 4 December 2017; being substituted on for Eric Remedi with five minutes remaining. He made three further appearances in 2017–18 before fourteen more occurred in 2018–19. He scored his first senior goal in the latter, netting in a Copa Argentina victory over Juventud Unida on 27 February 2019. 

Loan to Talleres

The succeeding August saw Payero depart on loan to fellow Primera División team Talleres. He scored once, versus Newell's Old Boys, in eighteen matches for them.

Middlesbrough

On 5 August 2021, Payero joined Championship side Middlesbrough on a three-year deal for around €7 million.  On the 11th August he made his debut for the club in a cup game against Blackpool which Middlesbrough then lost 3-0. He made his league debut on the 14th August against Bristol City Which Middlesbrough went onto winning 2-1. He scored his first goal for the club in a 2-0 victory over Cardiff City on 23 October that year. He scored a penalty in the shootout against Manchester United as Middlesbrough knocked them out of the FA Cup on 4 February 2022. Just less than a week later Middlesbrough went to QPR, and Payero came on as a substitute in the 87th minute. Minutes later, he went into a tackle, injured himself, was stretchered off the pitch, and did not make an appearance for the  Middlesbrough Senior Team for the rest of the season. Just playing on the U23s.

Loan to Boca Juniours

On 14 July 2022, Payero returned to Argentina to join Boca Juniors on a season-long loan deal. On 23 October 2022, the 2022 Argentine Primera División ended with Payero's Boca Juniors winning the league title.

International career
Payero has previously been called up to train with the Argentina U20 squad. He played in all three of Argentina's matches in the 2020 Summer Olympics.

Career statistics

Honours 
Boca Juniors
Primera División: 2022
Supercopa Argentina: 2022

References

External links

1998 births
Living people
Sportspeople from Córdoba Province, Argentina
Argentine footballers
Association football midfielders
Club Atlético Banfield footballers
Talleres de Córdoba footballers
Middlesbrough F.C. players
Boca Juniors footballers
Argentine Primera División players
English Football League players
Olympic footballers of Argentina
Footballers at the 2020 Summer Olympics
Argentine expatriate footballers
Argentine expatriate sportspeople in England
Expatriate footballers in England